The Colegio Suizo de México, A.C. (CSM, Spanish: "Swiss College of Mexico") is a Swiss-education school with three campuses in Mexico. The Campus México is in Colonia del Valle, Benito Juárez, Mexico City. The Campus Cuernavaca is in Cuernavaca, Morelos. The Campus Querétaro is in Querétaro City, Querétaro. It serves levels maternal to preparatoria.

History
The school was founded in 1965 with 135 students. The first campus was on Calle Eugenia. The secundaria opened in 1968. The CCH high school program opened in 1971, with the first graduates in 1974. A new auditorium opened in 1973. The Cuernavaca campus opened in 1992, and it gained a secundaria in 1998. The same year, the Mexico City campus gained the secundaria B. The Querétaro campus opened in 2007.

See also
 Mexico–Switzerland relations

Further reading
 "Die kosmopolitischsten unter den Schweizer Schulen". Swissinfo. 7 July 2007. 
 EAD, Swiss National Library 
 Schweizerschule Mexiko, Campus Mexiko-Stadt
 Schweizerschule Cuernavaca

References

External links

 Colegio Suizo de México 
 
  

International schools in Mexico City
High schools in Mexico City
Buildings and structures in Morelos
Buildings and structures in Querétaro
Education in Morelos
Education in Querétaro
Benito Juárez, Mexico City
Cuernavaca
Querétaro City
Educational institutions established in 1965
1965 establishments in Mexico
Swiss international schools